This is a list of college football coaches with 30 seasons. Individuals on the list have served as head coach of a college football program for 30 or more seasons to be included on the list.

"College level" is defined as a four-year college or university program in either the National Association of Intercollegiate Athletics or the National Collegiate Athletic Association. If the team competed at a time before the official organization of either of the two groups but is generally accepted as a "college football program" it would also be included.

Coaches expected to be active in the (fall) 2021 season are in bold. Current through the end of the 2020–21 college football season.

See also
 List of college football coaches with 200 wins
 List of college football coaches with 100 losses
 List of college football coaches with 20 ties
 List of college football coaches with 0 wins
 List of college football coaches with a .750 winning percentage

Notes

References

30+ seasons as head coach